The 2023 IIHF Women's World Championship Division I comprises two international ice hockey tournaments of the 2023 Women's Ice Hockey World Championships organised by the International Ice Hockey Federation (IIHF).

The Group A tournament was scheduled to be played in Shenzhen, China from 11 to 17 April, but in March 2023 it was postponed. Group B will play in Suwon, South Korea, from 17 to 23 April 2023.

Group A tournament

Participants

Standings

Group B tournament

Participants

Standings

Results
All times are local (UTC+9)

References

2023
Division I
2023 IIHF Women's World Championship Division I
2023 IIHF Women's World Championship Division I
Sport in Shenzhen
Sports competitions in Suwon
2023 in Chinese sport
2023 in South Korean sport
IIHF
IIHF